Nyagatare is a town in the North East of Rwanda. With a population of more than 100,000, it is one of the most populous settlements in the Eastern Province along with Rwamagana and Kibungo.

Location
Nyagatare is located in Nyagatare District, Eastern Province, close to Rwanda's International borders with both Tanzania and Uganda. The coordinates of the town are:1° 18' 0.00"S, 30° 19' 30.00"E  (Latitude:-1.3000; Longitude:30.3250)

Overview
Nyagatare is the largest metropolitan area and the capital of Nyagatare District, in Eastern Province, in Rwanda's northeast. At the center of a cattle farming region,  the city is a point of milk collection for several milk producers such as Inyange Industries Ltd. Milk from Nyagatare is exported to other regions of Rwanda.
It hosts tiles manufacturing industry known as EAST AFRICA GRANITE INDUSTRIES

Infrastructure

Power 
As of July 2021, only 1% of the population has access to electricity, The Rwandan government is contracting for the construction of a hydroelectric dam and power plant north of Nyangatare on the Muvumbe river.

Water 
25% of households rely on water from public stand posts.

Population
In 2002, the population of Nyagatare, Rwanda was estimated at about 8,500. The population has grown considerably since 1994, boosted by an influx of former refugees from Uganda, reaching 52,107 in the 2012 census.

Points of interest
The following points of interest lie within the town limits or close to its edges:

 Offices of Nyagatare Town Council
 Offices of Nyagatare District Administration
 Nyagatare Central Market
 Nyagatare Hospital - A public hospital administered by the Rwanda Ministry of Health
 A branch of the Bank of Kigali
 A branch of Banque Populaire du Rwanda SA
 A branch of Ecobank Rwanda
 A branch of COGE Banque Rwanda
 Children Sharing Centre, Nyagatare - A center that caters for the needs of vulnerable young people
 There is also University of Rwanda, on the site of the former Umutara Polytechnic
 Also a private university, THE EAST AFRICAN UNIVERSITY RWANDA.
It is also the exit of Akageranationalpark Nyirangegene

See also
 Kigali
 Nyagatare District
 Eastern Province, Rwanda
 Bank of Kigali

References

External links
Location of Nyagatare At Google Maps

Nyagatare District
Eastern Province, Rwanda
Populated places in Rwanda